Fylde Flyers  were an English ice hockey team based in Cleveleys, Lancashire founded in 2011. They play in the English National Ice Hockey League, North Two. Home games are played at the Sub Zero Ice Rink, Cleveleys. The team lasted for only 2 seasons due to the small nature of their home rink at Cleveleys leading to the inability to attract players that would allow them to be competitive.

History
The Fylde coast had been without an ice hockey team since the demise of Blackpool Seagulls in 1993. In July 2011 it was announced that Fylde Flyers were to begin playing at the recently opened Sub Zero Ice Rink in Cleveleys and would compete in their inaugural season in the English National Ice Hockey League, North Two division. The team included former HK Prizma Riga player Elvis Veldze who has represented Latvia at under-20 level. The current captain is Wayne Whitby
Their first ever game was a 4–0 victory over Lancashire Raptors at Blackburn Arena on 10 September 2011. The first home game was a 9–4 win over Bradford Bulldogs on 10 December 2011.

The Flyers finished the 2011–12 season in 6th place with back-to-back victories: 9–3 over Hull Stingrays at home on 14 April 2012, and then 7–0 over Lancashire Raptors at Blackburn Ice Arena the following day. All-time top points scorer #77 Bobby Caunce Currently with Blackburn Hawks with 45 goals 52 Assist 97 points in 50 games over the two seasons. All-time top penalty minutes #8 Anthony Melbourne currently with Blackpool Seagulls with 209 mins in 51 games played over the two seasons.

Current squad

References

External links
 Fylde Flyers official website
 Fylde Flyers at eliteprospects website
 English National Ice Hockey League, North Two

Ice hockey teams in England
Ice hockey in England
Sport in the Borough of Wyre